The Australia's Future Tax System Review, informally known as the Henry Tax Review was commissioned by the Rudd Government in 2008 and published in 2010.  The review was intended to guide tax system reforms over the next 10 to 20 years.

Remit
The review was commissioned as one of the specific outcomes from the Australia 2020 Summit held in April 2008.

The review was a "root and branch" review, restricted only in that it could not consider increasing the rate or broadening the base of the Goods and Services Tax, imposing tax on superannuation payments to retirees over 60 years of age, or already-announced personal income tax changes.

Panel
The review panel members were:

 Dr Ken Henry (Chair), Secretary to the Treasury
 Dr Jeff Harmer, Secretary, Department of Families, Housing, Community Services and Indigenous Affairs
 Professor John Piggott, Professor of Economics and Associate Dean, Research, Australian School of Business, University of New South Wales
 Ms Heather Ridout, Chief Executive, Australian Industry Group
 Mr Greg Smith, Adjunct Professor, Economic and Social Policy, Australian Catholic University

Recommendations
The report made 138 specific recommendations, grouped under nine broad themes.

 Concentrating revenue raising on four efficient tax bases: personal income, business income, private consumption, and economic rents from natural resources and land.  Other taxes may be retained if they serve a specific policy purpose such as discouraging smoking or traffic congestion.  Taxes fitting into none of these categories should eventually be abolished.
 Configuring taxes and transfers to support productivity, participation and growth.
 An equitable, transparent and simplified personal income tax: a much higher tax-free threshold (around AUD 25,000), only two tax brackets, and a simplification of superannuation, deductions and offsets.
 A fair, adequate, and work supportive transfer system.
 Integrating consumption tax compliance with business systems.
 Efficient land and resource taxation.
 Completing retirement income reform and securing aged care.
 Toward more affordable housing: substantially increase rent assistance, gradually move to a uniform land tax and remove transfer taxes (stamp duty), and gradually move to a neutral treatment of rental and owner-occupied housing.
 A more open, understandable and responsive tax system.

Reception

Rudd government 
Rudd endorsed and implemented only 3 of the 138 recommendations.

The major item from the Henry Review implemented by the Rudd Government was the move to create a resources Super Profit Tax. The proposal was highly controversial, and has been suggested as the main reason why Rudd lost power. Following his replacement by Julia Gillard as Prime Minister, the proposed tax was replaced by a Mineral Resource Rent Tax. Most of the remaining recommendations were not implemented.

Liberal/National Coalition

Greens

Commentators
Former Liberal Leader John Hewson has been supportive.

References

External links
 Australia's Future Tax System Review official homepage.

Taxation in Australia
2008 establishments in Australia
Tax reform